Citterio is an Italian surname. Notable people with the surname include:

Anselmo Citterio (1927–2006), Italian cyclist
Antonio Citterio (born 1950), Italian furniture designer and industrial designer 
Giuseppe Citterio (born 1967), Italian cyclist
Guido Citterio (born 1931), Italian speed skater

Italian-language surnames